Linnecor is a surname. Notable people with the surname include:

Bert Linnecor (1933–2012), English footballer
Keith Linnecor